Between 1716 and 1767, Georg Philipp Telemann wrote a series of Passions, musical compositions reflecting on Christ's Passion – the physical, spiritual and mental suffering of Jesus from the hours prior to his trial through to his crucifixion. The works were written for performance in German churches in the days before Easter. A prolific composer, Telemann wrote over 40 Passions for the churches of Hamburg alone, of which 22 have survived according to the present state of research. He also wrote several Passion oratorios. Unlike the Passions intended for liturgical performance, they were not closely set to the literal text of the Gospels.

History
In his dissertation The Rise of Lyricism and the Decline of Biblical Narration in the Late Liturgical Passions of Georg Philipp Telemann (University of Pittsburgh, 2005), Jason Benjamin Grant describes the three basic periods of Telemann's Passion composition as follows:

Style
Stylistically, there are many differences between these works by Telemann and Johann Sebastian Bach's Passions, there are however more similarities with the Passions of C.P.E. Bach. The Telemann Passions were (unlike J. S. Bach's Leipzig Passions) not written for and used in the context of a separate Good Friday Vespers liturgical service, but rather in the regular church services for the five main churches in Hamburg for the Sundays of Lent (except for Oculi Sunday). In deference to Ulrich Leisinger, who states in the Passions Preface in the Carl Philipp Emanuel Bach Complete Works edition:  and quotes (he states) pages 656–657 of the 4th Vorrath (Volume) of Johann Mattheson's Plus Ultra, ein Stückwerk von neuer und mancherley Art. Hamburg never really adapted the bipartite division of Passion settings (Part 1 being before the Sermon and Part 2 after it).  What had changed was that after 1736, the narration of the Last Supper and the Entombment were eliminated (although in some cases, even before 1736 the Last Supper was not used, for example in the St Mark Passion attributed to Keiser). These Hamburg Passions were whole entities performed in succession. Unlike those in Leipzig, where the division before and after the Sermon was retained. The other issue with Leisinger's statement is that he quotes from a volume by Mattheson that is now lost.

Another element that is different between Telemann's and Sebastian Bach's works is viewpoint. Telemann was not a "preacher" like Bach was, although he did have a theological background and education. Telemann's viewpoint was that of the Enlightenment, which placed less emphasis on Christ's divinity and more on his humanity (to the extent that in many arias in both Telemann's and Emanuel Bach's works, Christ is referred to as "Menschenfreund" ("Friend of Man")). They emphasize less Christ as the revelation of God's will for the world and revelation of prophecy and divine grace, less Christ the Word incarnate, less Christ the Lamb of God, and more Christ the man, the healer, the sufferer. In opposition to this is Bach the Fifth Evangelist, Bach the Mystic, Bach the Orthodox Lutheran. One way that this difference is evidenced is the way Telemann and Sebastian Bach approach the word of Scripture. Bach does not alter one iota of the scriptural word, he writes the words of 
Scripture in red ink, and generally his whole attitude is that Scripture is supreme. In opposition to this is Telemann, who treats Scripture in his own manner. He does not hold it as sacred (as evidenced by two facts: in the St Matthew Passion of 1738, a whole Gospel verse is replaced by an aria, and in the 1744 St Luke Passion, he changes the order of Scripture verses (specifically Luke 22:43–44) in Movement 2).

Finally, Telemann employs a more lyric style than Bach does. While there are places in Bach's Passions where he does employ more flourishes in the recitatives, these are usually few and far between. Bach usually uses a word-and-music form where the music is made to fit the words. Telemann, however, fits the words to the music that he writes, to the extent that many parts of recitatives are either elongated or repeated verbatim.

Passion oratorios 
Telemann wrote 6 Passion Oratorios (all of which were not used in the liturgy proper, but were still used in the church [either in the lesser churches or during the period between Judica Sunday and Good Friday, when it was traditional to have virtually non-stop Passion performances in the churches]).

His 1716 Passion oratorio Der für die Sünde der Welt gemarterte Jesus ("Jesus Who was martyred for the Sins of the World", TWV 5:1), used a poetic meditation on the passion story by Barthold Heinrich Brockes. Telemann himself wrote the text for his second Passion oratorio, Seliges Erwägen des bittern Leidens und Sterbens Jesu Christi ("Blessed Contemplation of the Bitter Suffering and Dying of Jesus Christ", TWV 5:2a, later reworked as TWV 5:2), which was one of the most beloved and frequently performed Passions in eighteenth-century Germany.

Hamburg and Danzig liturgical Passions

Note that this list may be incomplete
 The Order of Church Service forbade performance of Passion music on Oculi Sunday (3rd Sunday in Lent—reserved for the Installation Music (Juraten-Einführungsmusik) at the Michaeliskirche) and the dense succession of Passion performances had to be modified whenever the Feast of the Annunciation (25 March) fell on a Sunday during Lent or anytime during Holy Week. and 
 The "Normal Order" for Passion music in Hamburg (as found in the Hamburg "Schreib-Kalendar") was as follows:

In 1745, due to the mourning period following the death of Charles VII, Holy Roman Emperor on 20 January 1745 (the mourning period lasting from 14 February–14 March), the performance schedule was altered in the following way:

Modern editions
Lukas-Passion 1728 "Israel, ach, geliebtes Vater-Herz!" (TWV 5:13). Georg Philipp Telemanns Musikalische Werke, Band 15, Hans Hörner and Martin Ruhnke, ed. Kassel, u. a.: Bärenreiter-Verlag, 1964.

Johannes Pausch's Edition Musiklandschaften has edited many of Telemann's late Passions (1991–2001):

Johannes-Passion 1757 (TWV 5:42). Editio princeps.
Matthäus-Passion 1758 (TWV 5:43). Wissenschaftliche Edition.
Marcus-Passion 1759 (TWV 5:44). Wissenschaftliche Edition.
Lukas-Passion 1760 (TWV 5:45). Editio princeps.
Johannes-Passion 1761 (TWV 5:46). Editio princeps.
Matthäus-Passion 1762 (TWV 5:47). Editio princeps.
Lukas-Passion 1764 (TWV 5:49). Editio princeps.
Johannes-Passion 1765 (TWV 5:50). Editio princeps.
Matthäus-Passion 1766 (TWV 5:51). Editio princeps.
Marcus-Passion 1767 (TWV 5:52). Editio princeps.
Seliges Erwägen, Berliner Fassung 1763 (TWV 5:2). Wissenschaftliche Ausgabe
Johannes-Passion 1745 "Ein Lämmlein geht und trägt die Schuld" (TWV 5:30).  Georg Philipp Telemanns Musikalische Werke, volume 29, Wolfgang Hirschmann, ed. Kassel, u. a.: Bärenreiter-Verlag, 1996.
Passions-Oratorium: Seliges Erwägen des Leidens und Sterbens Jesu Christi 1763 "Schmücke dich, o liebe Seele" (TWV 5:2).  Georg Philipp Telemanns Musikalische Werke, Band 33, Ute Pötzsch, ed. Kassel, u. a.: Bärenreiter-Verlag, 2001.
Betrachtung der 9. Stunde am Todestage Jesu 1755 "Erhole dich, o Sonne" (TWV 5:5)/ Der Tod Jesu 1755 "Du, dessen Augen flossen" (TWV 5:6). Georg Philipp Telemanns Musikalische Werke, Band 31, Wolf Hobohn, ed. Kassel, u. a.: Bärenreiter-Verlag, 2006.
Lukas-Passion 1744 "Wenn meine Sünd' mich kranken" (TWV 5:29).  Felix Schröder, ed.  Stuttgart: Carus-Verlag, 2007(?).
Johannes-Passion 1737 "Jesu, deine heligen Wunden" (TWV 5:22). Felix Schröder, ed.  Frankfurt/Main, u. A.: Edition Peters, 2007(?).
Der für die Sünde der Welt leidende und sterbende Jesus aus den IV. Evangelisten (Brockes-Passion) 1716 "Mich vom Stricke meiner Sünden" (TWV 5:1).  Georg Philipp Telemanns Musikalische Werke, Band 34, Carsten Lange, ed. Kassel, u. a.: Bärenreiter-Verlag, 2008.

Selected recordings
Telemann: St. John Passion TWV 5:50 (Catherine Bott, Sarah Connolly, Reginaldo Pinheiro, Jan van der Crabben, Philip Defrancq; Collegium Instrumentale Brugense, Capella Brugensis; conductor: Patrick Peire).  Eufoda EUF1224.
Telemann: St. Matthew Passion TWV 5:31 (Barbara Schlick, Claudia Schubert, Wilfried Jochens, Stefan Dörr, Achim Rück, Hans-Georg Wimmer; Collegium Vocale des Bach-Chores Siegen; Barock-Orchester "La Stravaganza-Köln"; conductor: Ulrich Stötzel). Brilliant Classics 992277 (first issued by Hänssler).
Telemann: Passions Oratorium – Das selige Erwägen des bittern Leiden und Sterbens Jesu Christi TWV 5:2 (Barbara Locher, Zeger Vandersteene, Stefan Dörr, Berthold Possemeyer, Rene Schmidt; Freiburger Vokalensemble; L'arpa festante München; conductor: Wolfgang Schäfer). Brilliant Classics 99521 (licensed from Bayer Records)--Version unknown.

See also
 Passion music
 Passions (C. P. E. Bach), including several parodies from Telemann
 Passions (Bach) (Johann Sebastian Bach)

References

External links 
 Complete list of Telemann's extant Passions (including the Passion oratorios), Robert Poliquin, Université du Québec.

Sacred vocal music by Georg Philipp Telemann
Telemann
Gethsemane